Hariharpur  is a village development committee in Kapilvastu District in the Lumbini Zone of southern Nepal. At the time of the 1991 Nepal census it had a population of 4324 people living in 740 individual households.

References

krishna raj panthee

Populated places in Kapilvastu District